Jonathan Philip "Jonty" Hearnden (born 1960 in Brentwood, Essex) is an English antiques expert and television presenter. Though born in London Road, Brentwood (his parents owned a toy shop and a gentlemen's outfitters in Shenfield until shortly after his birth), he was brought up in Dorchester-on-Thames in Oxfordshire.

Education
Hearnden was educated at Shiplake College, an independent school in Shiplake, near Henley-on-Thames in Oxfordshire. Hearnden was diagnosed with dyslexia at an early age.

Career
Jonty Hearnden began working with Bonhams Auctioneers London in 1979 as a furniture cataloguer. His further career included management of Lots Road Galleries, an auction room in London. In 1990 he started as an antiques dealer through his business, Dorchester Antiques, in Dorchester-on-Thames, Oxfordshire.

Television appearances
, Hearnden has appeared on the following TV shows (all BBC):

Antiques Roadshow
20th Century Road Show
Going for a Song
Cash in the Attic
Sun, Sea and Bargain Spotting
Put Your Money Where Your Mouth Is
Through the Keyhole

Publications
 2004 - Miller's Buyer's Guide: Late Georgian to Edwardian Furniture
 2007 - Miller's What's In Your Attic?: Discover Antique and Collectable Treasures in Your Home

References

External links

1960 births
Living people
English television presenters
Antiques experts
English Buddhists
Converts to Buddhism
People from Brentwood, Essex
People from South Oxfordshire District
People educated at Shiplake College